The Antiquary might refer to:

The Antiquary, a novel by Sir Walter Scott
The Antiquary (play), a 17th-century play by Shackerley Marmion
The Antiquary (magazine), a magazine published 1880–1915.